William Reymond is a journalist and writer of several investigations about John F. Kennedy: JFK, Autopsy of a State Crime (JFK, Autopsie d'un Crime d'Etat), JFK, The Last Witness (JFK, le Dernier Témoin, with co-author Billie Sol Estes).

He is co-writer (with Yves Simoneau) for movie Assassin's Creed: Lineage that consisted of 3 series filmed as prequel to the video game 'Assassin's Creed II.

Biography

William Reymond lives in Dallas. He is regular contributor for Canal+, French television channel.

Reviews of selected William Reymond's books

Dominici not guilty
One of William Reymond investigation 'Dominici not guilty' (Dominici non coupable) is about Dominici affair. William Reymond traces a version about Soviet Union' Cold war program to kidnap and kill scientists, who were cooperating with Britain, as if the Soviet intelligence hired murderers in Germany, who as if killed the people, Jack Drummond, together with his wife and 10-year-old daughter, but French government, as if seeking friendship with Soviet Union, and avoiding scandal of its weak state security, silenced the murder, accusing nearby peasants of Dominici family in the crime, who were as if actually innocent.

Books
Dominici non coupable: les assassins retrouvés [Dominici not guilty: the assassins found], Flammarion, November 1, 1998, 372 p.
JFK: autopsie d'un crime d'État [JFK: autopsy of a state crime], Flammarion, January 22, 1999, 492 p.
Rouge lavande [Lavender red], Flammarion, May 27, 1999, 267 p.
Mémoire de profs : Missions, joies et craintes, les profs parlent [Teachers' memory: Missions, joys and fears, the teachers speak], Flammarion, September 9, 1999, 207 p.
Les cigales de Satan [Satan's cicadas], Flammarion, June 13, 2000, 278 p.
Mafia S.A.: les secrets du crime organisé [Mafia S.A.: the secrets of organized crime], Flammarion, November 11, 2001, 454 p.
Lettre ouverte pour la révision [Open letter for review], Flammarion, May 22, 2003, 290 p.
JFK: le dernier témoin [JFK: the last witness], Flammarion, 24 octobre 2003, 400 p.
Bush Land (2000-2004), Flammarion, September 4, 2004, 456 p.
Coca-Cola : l'enquête interdite [Coca-Cola: the prohibited investigation], Flammarion-Enquête, January 27, 2006, 432 p. ( et 2-08-068764-6)
Toxic: Obésité, malbouffe, maladie : enquête sur les vrais coupables [Toxic: Obesity, junk food, illness: investigation of the real culprits], Flammarion, February 21, 2007, 354 p.
Marilyn: le dernier secret [Marilyn: the last secret], Flammarion, February 20, 2008, 368 p.
Toxic Food: enquête sur les secrets de la nouvelle malbouffe [Toxic Food: Investigating the Secrets of New Junk Food], Flammarion, 2009, 316p.

References

External links section 
 Official website

Assassin's Creed
Living people
World Series of Poker bracelet winners
Researchers of the assassination of John F. Kennedy
French male writers
Year of birth missing (living people)